The Joseph E. Hall House is a privately owned residential house located at 210 South Oneida Street in the city of Tecumseh in Lenawee County, Michigan.  It was designated as a Michigan State Historic State and listed on the National Register of Historic Places on August 13, 1986.  It is located just around the corner from the George J. Kempf House.

History
The house was built in as early as 1870 for Joseph E. Hall, a local jeweler and instrument maker. It was designed and constructed by Salmon Crane, who was a leading architect in Tecumseh in the second half of the nineteenth century. Hall and his family lived here until 1882, when it was purchased by Sylvester Erskine, a barber and saloon keeper.

Description
The house was designed in the style mix of Italianate and Late Victorian architecture.  It is a modestly sized brick house, typical of those built in the area at the time. It is noted for its irregular L-shaped design, which features a square tower located between the arms of the L. The house has widely projecting eaves supported by simple paired brackets. Window openings in the main section have segmental-arch heads without caps, while in the tower they have round heads and corbelled brick caps. A hip-roof, brick-pier porch wraps around the front of the house and part of one side.

References

Houses in Lenawee County, Michigan
Houses on the National Register of Historic Places in Michigan
Italianate architecture in Michigan
Victorian architecture in Michigan
Michigan State Historic Sites
Houses completed in 1870
National Register of Historic Places in Lenawee County, Michigan
Tecumseh, Michigan
1870 establishments in Michigan